Choi Woo-shik (born March 26, 1990) is a Canadian actor based in South Korea. He first gained widespread recognition for his leading role in the film Set Me Free (2014). He then co-starred in the films Train to Busan (2016) and Parasite (2019), both of which received international critical acclaim and success, the latter winning the Palme d'Or at Cannes and the Academy Award for Best Picture.

Early life
Choi was born in Seoul, South Korea, the younger of two sons. He migrated to Vancouver, Canada with his family when he was ten years old, in grade five, where he spent the next ten years of his life. He attended high school at Pinetree Secondary School. His English name is Edward Choi and he goes by the nickname Eddie.

In 2011, while attending Simon Fraser University, then-21-year-old Choi was given permission by his parents to attend an acting audition in Korea, subsequently leading to him making his acting debut. Whilst in Korea, Choi enrolled at Chung-Ang University, where he majored in cultural studies.

Career

2011–2015: Early years 
Choi made his acting debut in the period drama The Duo in 2011. Supporting roles followed, and Choi was cast in crime drama Special Affairs Team TEN as detective Park Min-ho. Choi reprised his role when the series was renewed for a second season in 2013. He made his big screen debut that same year, starring as a supporting character in the film Flu (film) and Secretly, Greatly. In the interim, Choi played several characters on television series such as Rooftop Prince, You Are My Destiny and Pride and Prejudice.

In 2014, Choi took on his first leading role in the coming-of-age independent film Set Me Free. He played the role of Young-jae, a sixteen-year-old student living in a group home, who pretends that he wants to become a priest in order to prolong his stay at the home. The film was well received by critics, and Choi was praised for his portrayal of the protagonist's inner conflict. He won several awards for his acting, including Actor of the Year at the Busan International Film Festival. Later that year, Choi also starred in the action comedy film Big Match, playing the role of genius hacker Guru.

Choi starred as the titular character in the romantic comedy cable series Hogu's Love. The series began airing on 9 February 2015. Choi also took part in the R-rated Hong Kong-Singaporean film In the Room later that year. The film featured an anthology of characters, set in a single-room brothel at a hotel in Singapore.

2016–present: Rising fame and international breakthrough 
Choi first gained international recognition with the blockbuster zombie thriller film Train to Busan, where he played the role of high school baseball player, Yong-guk. Premiering at the 2016 Cannes Film Festival on May 13, the film was a critical and commercial success, going on to gross over $93.1 million worldwide. He followed this up with a short, but memorable role as a truck driver in action-adventure film Okja. This marked his first collaboration with director Bong Joon-ho and featured an international cast, including Tilda Swinton and Paul Dano. Okja was screened in several independent theatres domestically, and released on streaming platform Netflix worldwide.

Choi continued starring in several other films after this, including The Princess and the Matchmaker and Monstrum. In 2018, Choi was cast as a mysterious assassin called the "Nobleman" in the action film The Witch: Part 1. The Subversion. The dark persona of the Nobleman was a shift from the characters Choi usually played. In a press interview, co-star Park Hee-soon remarked that Nobleman could be Choi's once-in-a-lifetime character.

In 2019, Choi reunited with director Bong Joon-ho for the black comedy thriller film Parasite. Choi played the main character Ki-woo, the son of a poor family, who schemes to become employed by a wealthy family by infiltrating their household and posing as unrelated, highly qualified individuals. Choi was first approached by Bong after their first collaboration with Okja in 2016, who told the actor to "stay skinny" to play the character. Parasite premiered at the 2019 Cannes Film Festival on 21 May 2019, where it became the first South Korean film to win the Palme d'Or, and was the first film to win with a unanimous vote since Blue Is the Warmest Colour at the 2013 Festival. Among other numerous accolades, Parasite won a leading four awards at the 92nd Academy Awards. It became the first South Korean film to receive Academy Award recognition, as well as the first film in a language other than English to win Best Picture. The cast also won the award for Outstanding Performance by a Cast in a Motion Picture at the 26th Screen Actors Guild Awards. In addition to his role as Ki-woo in Parasite, Choi performed the end credits song "Soju One Glass," which made the shortlist for the Academy Award for Best Original Song.

In December 2021, Choi starred in the SBS drama Our Beloved Summer alongside Kim Da-mi. It marked his return to the small screen in 4 years since 2017, as well as the reunion of the two actors after their film The Witch: Part 1. The Subversion (2018).

In 2022, Choi returned to the big screen with the film The Policeman's Lineage which premiered on January 12, 2022. He will also star in upcoming South Korean sci-fi fantasy film Wonderland.

Filmography

Film

Television series

Web series

Television shows

Music video appearances

Discography

Awards and nominations

References

External links

 
 

1990 births
Living people
21st-century South Korean male actors
JYP Entertainment artists
Chung-Ang University alumni
Male actors from Seoul
South Korean male film actors
South Korean male television actors
South Korean emigrants to Canada
Naturalized citizens of Canada
Canadian male actors of Korean descent
Canadian male film actors
Canadian male television actors
Canadian male voice actors
Outstanding Performance by a Cast in a Motion Picture Screen Actors Guild Award winners